The following is a list of mayors of the city of Kyiv, Ukraine. It includes positions equivalent to mayor, such as chairperson of the city council executive committee.

Mayors

Russian Empire
 Bohdan Somkovych, 1649-1660
 Danilo Polotsky, 1660-1675
 Fedir-Zhdan Tadryna, 1675-1677
 Zhdan Tadryna, 1677-1687
 Jan Bykovsky, 1687-1699
 Fedor Bykovsky, 1699
 Dmytro Polotsky, 1699-1723
 Kuzma Krychevyts, 1733–1734) 
 Pavlo Voynich, 1734-1751
 Ivan Sychevsky, 1753-1766
 Hryhoriy Pyvovarov, 1766-1781
 Yakiv Davydovsky, 1781-1785
 Vasyl Kopystensky, 1785-1787
 Yuhym Mytyuk, 1787-1790
 Hryhoriy Radzytsky, 1790-1801
 Heorhiy Rybalsky, 1801-1813
 Philip Lakerda, 1813-1814
 Mykhailo Hryhorenko, 1815-1826
 Hryhoriy Kiselivsky, 1826-1834

elected mayors
 , 1835-1837
 , 1837-1838
 , 1838-1841
 , 1841-1844
 , 1844-1847
 , 1847-1851
 , 1851-1853
 , 1853-1854
 , 1854-1857
 , 1857-1860
 , 1860-1863 
 , 1863-1871 
 , 1871–1872, 1873-1874
 , 1872-1873
 , 1875-1879
 , 1879-1884
 , 1884-1887
 , 1887-1900
 , 1900-1906
 , 1906-1916
 , 1916-1917

Ukrainian People's Republic
 Yevhen Ryabtsov, 1917-1918
 Ipolyt Dyakov, 1918
 Yevhen Ryabtsov, 1918-1919
 , 1919
 Mykola Livytskyi, 1920

Ukrainian Soviet Socialist Republic
 Hryhoriy Chudnovsky, 1918
 Andrei Bubnov, 1919
 Andriy Ivanov, 1919-1920
 Mykhailo Vetoshkin, 1920
 Yan Gamarnik, 1920-1923
 Hryhoriy Hrynko, 1923-1925
 , 1925
 Panas Lyubchenko, 1925-1927
 , 1928-1932
 , 1932
 , 1932-1934
 , 1934-1937
 , 1937
 Taras Mitulinsky, 1937
 , 1937-1938
 , 1938-1941

Reichskommissariat Ukraine
 Oleksander Ohloblyn, 1941
 Volodymyr Bahaziy, 1941-1942
 , 1942-1943

Ukrainian Soviet Socialist Republic
 , 1943-1944
 , 1944-1946
 , 1946-1947
 , 1947-1963
 , 1963-1968
 Volodymyr Gusev, 1968-1979
 , 1979-1990
 , 1990
 , 1990-1991

Ukraine
 Hryhoriy Malyshevsky, 1991
 Oleksandr Mosiyuk, 1991-1992
 Ivan Dankevych, 1992
 Leonid Kosakivsky, 1994-1998
 Oleksandr Omelchenko, 1999-2006
 Leonid Chernovetskyi, 2006-2012
 Halyna Hereha, 2012-2014
 Vitali Klitschko, 2014-

See also
 Mayor of Kyiv
 Kyiv City Council
 Timeline of Kyiv
 History of Kyiv

References

This article incorporates information from the Ukrainian Wikipedia.

External links 

History of Kyiv
Kyiv